The Young Ones may refer to:

 The Young Ones (1961 film), a 1961 musical starring Cliff Richard, the American title is It's Wonderful to be Young!
 "The Young Ones" (song), title song to the film and a number-one 1962 single, by Cliff Richard and the Shadows
 The Young Ones (album), the soundtrack album to the 1961 film
 The Young Ones (1973 film), a 1973 Taiwanese film, spoken in Mandarin
 The Young Ones (TV series), a 1980s British sitcom about four students living together (which uses the song "The Young Ones" as its theme tune)
 The Young Ones (video game), a video game based on the British comedy television series
 Young Ones (film), a 2014 science fiction film
 The Young One, a 1960 English language film directed by Luis Buñuel, also called La joven
 The Young One (2016 film), a French-Portuguese film, original title Jeunesse
 The Young Ones, a 2010 British TV series about six well-known people in their 70s and 80s, which included Kenneth Kendall